The 1998 World Lacrosse Championship final between Canada and the United States was the gold medal game of the 1998 World Lacrosse Championship and has been often cited as the best field lacrosse game of all time.

Context
The United States had not lost an international lacrosse game since the 1978 WLC final, up until then, their only loss in international competition. Although expected to be challenged somewhat by the Canadians, the U.S. team was widely expected to take the gold. Their round robin match had ended in a 14-12 U.S. victory.

Rosters

Canada

Jamie Bowen
Steve Fannell
Gary Gait
Paul Gait
Eric Gervais
Chris Gill
Jeff Gombar
Steve Govett
John Grant, Jr.
Del Halliday
Fred Jenner
Bryan Kopec
Tom Marechek
Randy Mearns
Tom Phair
Jeff Ratcliffe
Darren Reisig
Chris Sanderson
Ted Sawicki
Matt Shearer
Dan Stroup
Rodney Tapp
John Tavares
Steve Toll
Jim Veltman
Rob Williams

United States

Head Coach: Bill Tierney
Assistant Coaches: William Beroza, Jeff Long, Paul Wehrum

Goalkeepers
Sal LoCascio
Brian Dougherty

Attack
Bill Miller
Michael Watson
Mark Millon
Darren Lowe
Jesse Hubbard
Casey Powell

Midfield
Kevin Finneran
Andy Ross
David Curry
Rob Shek
Greg Traynor
Charlie Lockwood
Peter Jacobs
Blake Miller
Tim Soudan
Ryan Wade
Milford Marchant

Defense
Brian Voelker
Joe Breschi
David Morrow
Pat McCabe
Zack Colburn
Reid Jackson
John DeTommaso

Source:

Game

First Quarter
After USA goaltender Sal Locasio made an early save, Canada drew first blood but it ended up being their only goal of the entire half.

Third Quarter
By the middle of the 3rd quarter the United States was up 11–1.

Fourth Quarter
By the last few minutes of the fourth quarter the score was 13–10, with USA still in the lead. Then in the last minute and a half of regulation, Canada had three unanswered goals to tie the game and send it into overtime.

Double Overtime
The United States barely outscored Canada in double overtime, 2–1, with the final score being 15–14 in favor of the US.

See also
World Lacrosse Championship
Federation of International Lacrosse
Field lacrosse

References

External links
 Laxpower web site video of the finals 

Lacrosse Championship Final
1998 Final
World Lacrosse